Celeste Freytes Gonzalez (born 1950s) is a Puerto Rican teacher who was named, in 2013, interim President of the University of Puerto Rico. When ratified in that position during 2016, she substituted Uroyoan Walker Ramos as president of the institution and Dr. Jose Lasalde as interim President.

Freytes Gonzalez announced on February 16, 2017, that she and other UPR leaders were renouncing from their positions, a move that was investigated by the Puerto Rican senate. She was substituted by Nivia Fernandez as interim president of the UPR.

Biography
Freytes Gonzalez graduated from a local university in San Juan in 1979. She studied at the University of Puerto Rico and earned her doctoral degree from Boston University in 1979. She was a teacher on the Puerto Rican education system for 36 years, and at the moment of her ascending to interim President of the UPR (PRU) she was a commissioner on the Middle States Commission on Higher Education.

In 2013, Freytes was a member of Puerto Rico Governor Alejandro Garcia Padilla's transitional team before he took office as governor; Garcia Padilla contacted her directly about becoming interim president of the UPR before she was named to the position.

See also
List of Puerto Ricans

External links

1950s births
Boston University alumni
Living people
Puerto Rican educators
University of Puerto Rico faculty